USS Minneapolis has been the name of more than one United States Navy ship, and may refer to:

, was a cruiser in service from 1894 to 1921
, was a heavy cruiser commissioned in 1934, in heavy action throughout the Pacific War, and decommissioned in 1947
, the twenty-first , in commission from 1984 to 2008
 is a

See also 

United States Navy ship names